Pennsylvania Emergency Management Agency, also known as PEMA, is an independent cabinet-level agency in Pennsylvania tasked with the response to, preparedness for, recovery from, and the mitigation or prevention of disasters (natural and otherwise) and other emergencies.

See also
 List of Pennsylvania state agencies
 Federal Emergency Management Agency

References

State agencies of Pennsylvania
Emergency management in the United States